Jean Isnard (27 July 1901 – 23 September 1976) was a French cinematographer.

Selected filmography
 To the Polls, Citizens (1932)
 Mademoiselle Josette, My Woman (1933)
 The Mysteries of Paris (1935)
 The Lover of Madame Vidal (1936)
 The Flame (1936)
 The Green Jacket (1937)
 Women's Prison (1938)
 Night in December (1940)
 Domino (1943)
 Marie-Martine (1943)
 The Misfortunes of Sophie (1946)
 The Sea Rose (1946)
Coincidences (1947)
 Unvanquished City (1950)
 Les Miracles n'ont lieu qu'une fois (1951)

References

Bibliography
 Martin O'Shaughnessy. Jean Renoir. Manchester University Press, 2000.

External links

1901 births
1976 deaths
Cinematographers from Paris